Weston is a village and civil parish in the North Hertfordshire district of Hertfordshire, England.

It is located around 4 miles north of Stevenage, 2.5 miles south of Baldock and the same distance south-east of Letchworth, although it lies in the Hitchin post town. The A1(M) motorway passes to the west and the A505 Baldock bypass to the north, in a cut-and-cover tunnel that passes through the Weston Hills. These hills were made famous by the Robin Hood-style character Jack o'Legs, who was allegedly buried in the village's church graveyard.

Weston Road and the Village of Weston, both within Toronto, were named after this place.

The Legend Of Jack o'Legs

The legend of Jack o'Legs is connected to the village of Weston, and explained on a signpost in the village green. The legend is that a Jack o'Legs was an abnormally tall man who stole from shops in the nearby town of Baldock.

He took his lootings and hid them in a cave somewhere around Weston Hills. After he was captured and severely wounded by the shopkeepers of Baldock he shot an arrow from there 3 miles into the churchyard at Weston to show where he wished to be buried.

In the churchyard of Holy Trinity Church, Weston, there is a grave for Jack o'Legs, which is unusually long, possibly placed there to fuel belief in the legend.

Windmill
A traditional windmill survives in Weston, although it is in need of refurbishment.

See also 
 Weston, Ontario

Gallery

References

External links 

Villages in Hertfordshire
Civil parishes in Hertfordshire